Ólöf Arnalds (born 4 January 1980) is an Icelandic singer-songwriter and indie musician who has been active within the Icelandic music scene since the early 2000s. She was a touring member of múm for five years from 2003 before launching her solo career and has released three albums to date. She has collaborated with bands and artists such as Björk, Stórsveit Nix Noltes, Mugison, Slowblow and Skúli Sverrisson. Between 1988 and 2002, Ólöf studied violin and classical singing, and from 2002 to 2006 she studied composition and new media at Iceland Academy of the Arts.

In 2007, her debut album Við Og Við was released by 12 Tónar. The album features a set of songs performed mostly in a traditional troubadour style. Her second album, Innundir skinni, was released by One Little Independent Records in September 2010.
Her third album is Sudden Elevation and was released (again by One Little Independent Records) in February 2013.

Við og Við 
Ólöf's debut album Við og Við was originally released in Iceland in 2007 by 12 Tónar, but was not released in the United Kingdom and the United States until 2009, after she had signed to One Little Independent Records. Word of mouth – including Björk's patronage – earned Við og Við high-profile plaudits in the US, ranking in Paste Magazine's Top 100 Albums of 2007 and eMusic's editor's list of the Best Albums of 2008. The success of Við og Við in the US led to Ólöf touring with Blonde Redhead, Jonathan Richman, Björk, The Dirty Projectors and Jeff Mangum, and to her being covered extensively in US publications including Vanity Fair, The New York Times, Village Voice and Time Out New York.

Innundir Skinni 
Ólöf's second album Innundir Skinni was released in 2010 by One Little Independent Records. It marked a departure from her previous work by including three English language songs, including the single Surrender, which features Björk's distinctive vocal in the background.

The album was produced by then Sigur Rós members Kjartan Sveinsson and Davíð Þór Jónsson, and featured contributions from Björk, Skúli Sverrisson (Laurie Anderson, Lou Reed), Shahzad Ismaily (Tom Waits, Plastic Ono Band, Bonnie "Prince" Billy), María Huld Markan Sigfúsdóttir (Amiina), and Ragnar.

Sudden Elevation 
Ólöf released her third album Sudden Elevation in 2013 on One Little Independent Records and it is her first album sung entirely in English. Produced again by long-time collaborator, Skúli Sverrisson, Sudden Elevation was largely recorded in a late autumn 2011 stint in a seaside cabin in Hvalfjörður, western Iceland.

Discography

Albums 
 Við Og Við (2007)
 Innundir skinni (2010)
 Sudden Elevation (2013)
 Palme (2014)
 Palma (2014, Icelandic language version exclusive to Pledge Music)

EPs 
 Ölof Sings (Sept. 2011)
 The Matador EP (Oct. 2013)

Singles 
 7" Maria Bethânia/Sveitin milli sanda (August 2009)
 7" Innundir skinni/Close My Eyes (June 2010)
 7" Crazy Car/Sukiyaki (September 2010)
 7" Surrender/Instans (March 2011)

References

External links 
 Official website
 Ólöf Arnalds review at Favorite10.com
 Videos of Ólöf Arnalds performing live at lofi.tv
 Videos of Ólöf Arnalds performing on KEXP radio, Seattle at brooklynvegan.com
 Ólöf Arnalds interview at voixdesgeysers

1980 births
Living people
Olof Arnalds
Olof Arnalds
Olof Arnalds
Olof Arnalds
21st-century Icelandic women singers